Oakwood Avenue Presbyterian Church is a historic Presbyterian church located at Troy, Rensselaer County, New York. It was built in 1868, and is a two-story, three bay by five bay, rectangular frame building.  It has a gable roof topped by belfry.  An education wing was added in 1957.

It was listed on the National Register of Historic Places in 2012.

References

Troy, New York
Presbyterian churches in New York (state)
Churches on the National Register of Historic Places in New York (state)
Victorian architecture in New York (state)
Churches completed in 1868
Churches in Rensselaer County, New York
National Register of Historic Places in Troy, New York